The 2020 South Point 400 was a NASCAR Cup Series race held on September 27, 2020, at Las Vegas Motor Speedway in Las Vegas. Contested over 268 laps—extended from 267 laps due to an overtime finish, on the  asphalt intermediate speedway, it was the 30th race of the 2020 NASCAR Cup Series season, the fourth race of the Playoffs, and the first race of the Round of 12.

Report

Background

Las Vegas Motor Speedway, located in Clark County, Nevada outside the Las Vegas city limits and about 15 miles northeast of the Las Vegas Strip, is a  complex of multiple tracks for motorsports racing. The complex is owned by Speedway Motorsports, Inc., which is headquartered in Charlotte, North Carolina.

Entry list
 (R) denotes rookie driver.
 (i) denotes driver who are ineligible for series driver points.

Qualifying
Kevin Harvick was awarded the pole for the race as determined by competition-based formula.

Starting Lineup

Race

Stage Results

Stage One
Laps: 80

Stage Two
Laps: 80

Final Stage Results

Stage Three
Laps: 107

Race statistics
 Lead changes: 20 among 11 different drivers
 Cautions/Laps: 7 for 36
 Red flags: 0
 Time of race: 3 hours, 3 minutes and 32 seconds
 Average speed:

Media

Television
NBC Sports covered the race on the television side. Rick Allen, Jeff Burton, Steve Letarte and Dale Earnhardt Jr. called the action from the booth at Charlotte Motor Speedway. Brad Daugherty called the action on site. Marty Snider and Kelli Stavast handled the pit road duties on site, and Dave Burns handled pit road duties from Charlotte Motor Speedway during the race.

Radio
PRN had the radio call for the race, which will also simulcast on Sirius XM NASCAR Radio. Doug Rice and Mark Garrow called the race from the booth when the field raced through the tri-oval. Rob Albright called the race from a billboard in turn 2 when the field raced through turns 1 and 2 & Pat Patterson called the race from a billboard outside of turn 3 when the field raced through turns 3 and 4. Brad Gillie and Brett McMillan handled the duties on pit lane.

Standings after the race

Drivers' Championship standings

Manufacturers' Championship standings

Note: Only the first 16 positions are included for the driver standings.

References

South Point 400
South Point 400
South Point 400
NASCAR races at Las Vegas Motor Speedway